The NWA Florida Television Championship was a secondary title in Championship Wrestling from Florida. It existed from 1970 until 1987.

Title history

Footnotes

References

Championship Wrestling from Florida championships
National Wrestling Alliance championships
Professional wrestling in Florida
Regional professional wrestling championships
Television wrestling championships